Simon Marnie is an Australian radio and television presenter.

Career

Radio 
Marnie was a student of the inaugural radio course at the Australian Film, Television and Radio School. 

Prior to joining ABC Radio Sydney, he worked at Triple J starting in work experience before moving to a full time position.

Simon currently hosts ABC Radio Sydney's weekend morning program across New South Wales. The program is broadcast throughout Sydney on Saturdays from 6am–12 noon and New South Wales from 10 am, and on Sundays from 10am–12 noon in Sydney.

Television 
Simon conceived and produced SBS TV's music show, nomad, produced on WOW TV and reported on ABC TV's TVTV.

Marnie is one of the hosts, along with Jane Hall, Bryce Holdaway, Del Irani and Dean Ipaviz as they guide families, couples or individuals through the trials and tribulations of their life-changing decision to escape the city, on the ABC program Escape from the City.

Personal life 
Marnie resides in the Sydney suburb of Maroubra with partner Amanda Brown.

See also
ABC Local Radio
ABC Radio Sydney

References

Year of birth missing (living people)
Living people
Australian radio personalities
Journalists from Sydney